Nashik East Assembly constituency is one of the 288 Vidhan Sabha (legislative assembly) constituencies of Maharashtra state, western India. This constituency is located in Nashik district. It is one of the six assembly segments under Nashik (Lok Sabha constituency).

Geographical scope
The constituency comprises parts of Nashik taluka viz. the following wards of Nashik Municipal Corporation - 1 to 10, 14, 16, 30 to 35, 40 to 42 and 67 to 70.

Members of the Legislative Assembly

References

Assembly constituencies of Nashik district
Assembly constituencies of Maharashtra